Constance of Castile (1136 or 1140 – 4 October 1160) was Queen of France as the second wife of Louis VII, who married her following the annulment of his marriage to Eleanor of Aquitaine. She was a daughter of Alfonso VII of León and Berengaria of Barcelona, but her year of birth is not known.

Life
The official reason for her husband's annulment from Eleanor of Aquitaine had been that he was too close a relative of Eleanor for the marriage to be legal by Church standards; however, he was even more closely related to Constance. They were second cousins through William I, Count of Burgundy.

Constance died giving birth to her second child. Desperate for a son, her husband remarried a mere five weeks after her death.

Constance was buried in the Basilica of Saint-Denis, Paris.

Children
Constance had two children:
 Margaret, 1157–1197, who married first Henry the Young King of England, and then Béla III of Hungary
 Alys, 1160–1220, who married William IV of Ponthieu

References

Sources

|-

Castilian House of Burgundy
French queens consort 
Deaths in childbirth
Leonese infantas
Castilian infantas
12th-century births
1160 deaths
Year of birth uncertain
Burials at the Basilica of Saint-Denis
12th-century nobility from León and Castile
12th-century French women
12th-century French people
Daughters of emperors
Daughters of kings